The Pacific Wrestling Federation (PWF)  is a professional wrestling world title in Japanese promotion All Japan Pro Wrestling, contested exclusively among junior heavyweight (<) wrestlers. It was created on July 31, 1986, when Hiro Saito defeated Brad Armstrong in a tournament final.

The original World Junior Heavyweight Championship belt had a similar design to the title it replaced, the NWA International Junior Heavyweight Championship, which had been around since 1982 and only replacing the word "International" with "World". This belt was replaced with a new belt on August 27, 2017. On June 3, 2019, then-champion Atsushi Aoki died from a motorcycle accident and the belt was retired and given to Aoki's family. A new belt with a new design debuted on January 3, 2020. There have been a total of 40 recognized champions who have had a combined 63 official reigns and six vacancies. The title is currently held by Naruki Doi who is in his first reign.



Title history

Combined reigns

Belt design
The standard Championship belt has five plates on a black leather strap.

See also
NWA International Junior Heavyweight Championship (predecessor)
AJPW Junior League

References

External links
All-Japan.co.jp title history
Wrestling-Titles.com: World Junior Heavyweight Title

All Japan Pro Wrestling championships
Junior heavyweight wrestling championships